Matteo Placida (born August 22, 1978) is an Italian former professional footballer who played as a defender. He made 120 appearances in the Italian professional leagues and had a lengthy career in the lower divisions. In international football, he represented Italy at under-18 level.

References

1978 births
Living people
Italian footballers
Association football defenders
A.C. Milan players
A.C. Monza players
A.C. Prato players
S.S.D. Pro Sesto players
Novara F.C. players
Örebro SK players
U.S. Pergolettese 1932 players
Como 1907 players
FeralpiSalò players
U.S.D. Lavagnese 1919 players
U.S.D. Olginatese players
A.S.D. Cittanova Interpiana Calcio players
Serie B players
Italian expatriate footballers
Expatriate footballers in Sweden
A.S.D. Civitavecchia 1920 players
S.C. Caronnese S.S.D. players